The Stella Maris Mtwara University College (STEMMUCO) is a constituent college of St. Augustine University of Tanzania in Mtwara, Tanzania.

Background 

Stella Maris Mtwara University College started as a University Centre of the Saint Augustine University of Tanzania (SAUT) in September 26, 2009. SAUT found it important to establish the centre which was later upgraded into a College in April 2012.

Academic programs 

The College offers various awards in categories of Certificates, Diplomas, Undergraduate Degrees, and Postgraduate (Graduate) Degree Programs. The College runs the following faculties;- Faculty of Education, Faculty of Social Science, Faculty of Business Administration, and Faculty of Law. Also the College runs the Directorate of Postgraduate Studies which offers the Master of Arts in Educational Management and Planning (MEMP) and Master of Business Administration (MBA). All awards offered by STEMMUCO are given in the name of the Saint Augustine University of Tanzania in subject to section (19), of the Universities Act No. 07 of 2005 of the United Republic of Tanzania. Moreover, the College runs the Centre for Energy Development and Management Studies.

References

External links
 Official Website of the Stella Maris Mtwara University College (STEMMUCO - SAUT)
 University Website (The Saint Augustine University of Tanzania) 

Colleges in Tanzania
St. Augustine University of Tanzania